Unforgettable is an American crime drama series created by Ed Redlich and John Bellucci for CBS, who serves as an executive producer alongside Carl Beverly and Sarah Timberman. It is based on the J. Robert Lennon's short story "The Rememberer". The series stars Poppy Montgomery as Carrie Wells, a former Syracuse, New York police detective, who has hyperthymesia, a rare medical condition that gives her the ability to remember everything. The fourth season of Unforgettable premiered on November 27, 2015 on A&E.

Series overview

Episodes

Season 1 (2011–12)

Season 2 (2013–14)

Season 3 (2014)

Season 4 (2015–16)

Notes

References

External links
 
 

Lists of American crime drama television series episodes